The first season of The Rising of the Shield Hero anime series was produced by Kinema Citrus and directed by Takao Abo, with Keigo Koyanagi handling series composition, Masahiro Suwa designing the characters and Kevin Penkin composing the music. The series adapts the first five volumes of the light novels written by Aneko Yusagi. The season ran from January 9 to June 26, 2019, on AT-X and other channels. It ran for 25 episodes. The season uses four pieces of theme music: two opening themes and two ending themes. The first opening theme is "RISE," performed by MADKID, while the first ending theme is  performed by Chiai Fujikawa. The second opening theme is "FAITH," performed by MADKID, while the second ending theme is  performed by Fujikawa. For episode 4, Asami Seto sang an insert song titled "Falling Through Starlight" as her character Raphtalia.



Episode list

Home media release

Japanese

English

References

2019 Japanese television seasons
The Rising of the Shield Hero episode lists